Mood's Covered Bridge was a historic covered bridge located in East Rockhill Township, Bucks County, Pennsylvania. It crossed the East Branch Perkiomen Creek. Built in 1874 in the town truss style, the bridge was 120 feet long and 15 feet wide.

It was added to the National Register of Historic Places on December 1, 1980.  It was destroyed by arson on June 22, 2004, and subsequently removed from the National Register of Historic Places. The wooden cover was subsequently rebuilt and the bridge reopened on February 15, 2008.

References

Covered bridges in Bucks County, Pennsylvania
Covered bridges on the National Register of Historic Places in Pennsylvania
Bridges in Bucks County, Pennsylvania
Bridges completed in 1874
National Register of Historic Places in Bucks County, Pennsylvania
Road bridges on the National Register of Historic Places in Pennsylvania
Wooden bridges in Pennsylvania
Lattice truss bridges in the United States
Covered bridges in the United States destroyed by arson
Former National Register of Historic Places in Pennsylvania